Freddy Koch (21 March 1916 – 10 August 1980) was a Danish film actor. He appeared in 22 films between 1945 and 1976. He was born in Copenhagen, Denmark and died in Denmark. He was married to Danish actress Birgitte Federspiel.

Selected filmography
 Relax Freddie (1966)
 Gøngehøvdingen (1961)
 Det skete på Møllegården (1960)
 Vi arme syndere (1952)
 The Red Meadows (1945)

External links

1916 births
1980 deaths
Danish male film actors
Male actors from Copenhagen
20th-century Danish male actors